A boat service is regularly scheduled transport using one or more boats, typically on a river, at a set charge, normally depending on the length of the trip and the type of passenger. The service may only be available for foot passengers.

Examples
 London, England: there is a boat service between Tate Britain and Tate Modern on the River Thames. London River Services (part of Transport for London) also provide a network of boat services on the Thames, for use by tourists and commuters.
 Scotland: Caledonian MacBrayne ferry company operates a network of boat services to 22 of Scotland's islands.
 Sydney, Australia: the Sydney Ferries provide an extensive network of boat services around Sydney Harbour and surrounding areas.
 Bangkok, Thailand:  the Chao Phraya Express Boat serves piers along the Chao Phraya River, and the Khlong Saen Saep Express Boat provides motor boat services along the city's canals.
 Mahart in Budapest, Hungary

See also 

 RORO
 Ferry
 MBTA boat
 Special Boat Service

External links 

 London River Services from Transport for London
 Tate to Tate boat service 

Boats
Water transport